Uran Gas Turbine Power Station is a gas-based thermal power plant located at Uran in Raigad district, Maharashtra. The power plant is operated by the Maharashtra State Power Generation Company (Mahagenco).
{
getch( )
}

Capacity
It has an installed capacity of 672 MW (4x108 MW, 2x120 MW).

References

Natural gas-fired power stations in Maharashtra
Raigad district
Year of establishment missing